The Gujarat Subah was a province (subah) of the Mughal Empire, encompassing the Gujarat region. The region first fell under Mughal control in 1573, when the Mughal emperor Akbar (r. 1556–1605) defeated the Gujarat Sultanate under Muzaffar Shah III. Muzaffar tried to regain the Sultanate in 1584 but failed. Gujarat remained the Mughal province governed by the viceroys and officers appointed by the Mughal emperors from Delhi. Akbar's foster brother Mirza Aziz Kokaltash was appointed as the subahdar (viceroy) who strengthened Mughal hold over the region. The nobles of former Sultanate continued to resist and rebel during the reign of the next emperor Jahangir (1605–1627) but Kokaltash and his successor subahdars subdued them. Jehangir also permitted the British East India Company to establish factories in Surat and elsewhere in Gujarat. The next emperor Shah Jahan (1627–1658) expanded his territories in south and his subahdars made hold over Kathiawar peninsula including Nawanagar. Shah Jahan had also appointed his prince Aurangzeb, who was involved in religious disputes, prince Dara Shikoh and later prince Murad Bakhsh as subahdars. Following battle of succession, Aurangzeb (1658–1707) came to the Mughal throne and his policies resulted in revolts and discontent. During his reign, the Marathas under Shivaji raided Surat (1666) and their incursions in Gujarat started. Till then Gujarat prospered due to political stability, peace and growing international trade.

During the next three emperors (1707–1719) who had brief reigns, the nobles became more and more powerful due to instability in the Delhi. The royals of Marwar were appointed viceroys frequently. During the reign of the emperor Muhammad Shah (1719–1748), the struggle between the Mughal and Maratha nobles were heightened with frequent battles and incursions. The south Gujarat was lost to the Marathas and the towns in north and central Gujarat was attacked on several occasions with frequent demand of tributes. The Marathas continued to grow their hold and the frequent change of viceroys did not reverse the trend. The competing houses of Marathas, Gaekwads and Peshwas engaged between themselves which slow down their progress for a while. They later made peace between themselves. During the reign of the next emperor Ahmad Shah Bahadur (1748–1754), there was nominal control over the nobles who acted on their own. There were frequent fights between themselves and with Marathas. Ahmedabad, the capital of province, finally fell to the Marathas in 1752. It was regained by noble Momin Khan for a short time but again lost to the Marathas in 1756 after a long siege. Finding opportunity, the British captured Surat in 1759. After a setback at Panipat in 1761, the Marathas strengthened their hold on Gujarat. During this fifty years, the power struggle between the Mughal nobles and Marathas caused disorder and the decline in prosperity.

Background

Gujarat under Humayun (1535–1536)
In 1532–1533, Gujarat Sultan Bahadur Shah provoked a war with Humayun, the Mughal Emperor of Delhi. The immediate cause of the hostility is understood to be Bahadur Shah's protection of Muhammad Zaman Mirza, a Timurid prince and brother-in-law of Humayun, who had previous plotted against Humayun and his government and had subsequently been held in confinement. This antagonism was furthered by Bahadur Shah's favorable reception of the Afghan princes of the Lodi dynasty (rules of the Delhi Sultanate) who had offended the Mughal Empire. As Bahadur Shah failed to extradite Muhammad Zaman Mirza, Humayun marched from Agra towards Chittor; he waited idly by Gwalior while Bahadur Shah laid siege to Chittor.

Bahadur Shah listened to the advice of Rumi Khan—who was considered to have secretly allied with Humayun after Bahadur Shah refused to uphold the promise of putting him in command of Chittor—over that of Taj Khan and Sadr Khan and established a fortified camp near Mandasor. While Bahadur Shah had significant artillery, Humayun took Rumi Khan's advice and cut Bahadur Shah's supplies. The highly effective blockade and the realization of Rumi Khan's betrayal forced Bahadur Shah to flee from the camp in April 1535. After fleeing Mandasor, Bahadur Shah took refuge in the hill-fortress of Mandu, which was summarily stormed by Humayun's troops. As a result, Malwa was annexed under the Mughal Empire and Bahadur Shah escaped first to Champaner via Songarh, next to Khambhat, and finally to Diu.

Humayun kept pursuit of Bahadur Shah until he found out that the latter had successfully retreated to Diu. Having abandoned his pursuit, Humayun encamped at Khambhat where an old aboriginal woman warned him of an upcoming night attack by 5,000-6,000 members of the Koli and Gowar tribes. Humayun was able to route the attack on account of the warning; however, given the perceived insult, he ordered the town of Khambhat to be set on fire and plundered. After being convinced to postpone the attack on Diu, Humayun returned to successfully lay siege to Champaner in August 1535.

In settling the government of Gujarat, Humayun nominated Mirza Askari, his brother, as the viceroy. Before he could resume his pursuit of Bahadur Shah, he received news that the eastern provinces of the Mughal Empire were revolting under Sher Khan Afghan and that the imperial garrisons in Malwa were being challenged by the local chieftains. No sooner had Humayun turned to attend to these matters, a counter was launched with Bahadur Shah's officers reclaiming the towns of Surat, Bharuch, and Khambhat. Bahadur Shah marched towards Ahmedabad while amassing an army but Mirza Askari and his army retreated without engaging in battle. Bahadur Shah continued to pursue the retreating forces defeating them in battle at Kanij near Mahemdavad. Under instruction from Humayun, Tardi Beg is said to have abandoned Champaner finally marking the end of the Mughal occupation of Gujarat under Humayun.

Having to deal with Humayun's march on the one side and the Portuguese attack at Diu on the other side, Bahadur Shah entered into the Treaty of Bassein in December 1534. The treaty granted the Portuguese Empire control of the town of Bassein (Vasai), required vessels bound for the Red Sea to call at Bassein to procure passes and pay customary dues on their return trip, and prohibited the building of warships at any of the Gujarat ports. At a later time, following his retreat to Diu, Bahadur Shah turned to the Portuguese Empire for assistance and entered into a second treaty with them in October 1535 granting them permission to build a fort at Diu in exchange for military assistance.

Under Mughal Empire (1573–1756)

Under Akbar (1573–1605)

In 1572—1573, Mughal Emperor Akbar conquered Gujarat Sultanate (now Gujarat, India) taking advantage of the puppet-ruler Sultan Muzaffar Shah III and his quarreling nobles. Muzaffar was held captive at Agra. Akbar appointed his foster brother Mirza Aziz Koka, the Khan-i-Azam, as the first viceroy who faced an insurrection by the rebel nobles of the former Sultanate. Akbar quickly came to aid, arrested the Gujarati nobles, and ended the insurrection. Raja Todar Mal was tasked to survey the land and fix the assessment in order to settle the land revenues. The viceroy Shihab-ud-din Ahmad Khan strengthened the cavalry and decreased crime. Sultan Muzaffar III escaped in 1578, returned with dissident troops that previously worked for ex-viceroy Shihab-ud-dín Ahmad Khan in 1583, and led an attack on Ahmedabad and recaptured it when the then viceroy Itimad Khan mistakenly left the city. Upon hearing of the events in Gujarat, Akbar reappointed Mirza Abdurrahim Khan (commonly known as Mirza Khan) as the viceroy who defeated Muzaffar III in the battle of Fateh Bagh in January 1584. Mirza Aziz Koka was appointed as the viceroy for a second time and defeated the combined forces of Sultan Muzaffar III, Jam of Navanagar, Daulat Khan Ghori of Junagadh, and the Kathi Loma Khuman in the battle of Bhuchar Mori. Muzaffar III was captured in Bhuj but he committed suicide, putting an end to the Gujarat Sultanate. Mirza Aziz Koka conquered Junagadh and established Mughal authority over Saurashtra in 1592 before leaving for Mecca on pilgrimage in 1593. Subsequently, Prince Murad Bakhsh was appointed as the viceroy on whose death, Mirza Aziz Koka returned a third time as the viceroy serving through his sons . Akbar was succeeded by Jahangir.

Under Jahangir (1605–1627)

Jahangir appointed Qulij Khan was as the viceroy of Gujarat in the first year of his reign. However, on account of Qulij Khan being called to Punjab and Sultan Muzaffar Shah III's son, Prince Bahadur, leading an insurrection around Ahmedabad, Jahangir sent Raja Vikramajit to Gujarat as his next viceroy. He was succeeded by Shaikh Farid-i-Bukhari (honored with the title of Murtaza Khan), a scholar and a military commander, who was responsible for constructing the fort of Kadi, a town in the Mehsana district. Mirza Aziz Koka was appointed as the viceroy for a fourth time but was asked to rule through his son Jahangir Quli Khan as his deputy; they subdued the rebellions and protests of the nobles of the former Sultanate and of the Hindu chiefs and successfully averted an invasion by Malik Ambar from Daulatabad in the south. The next viceroy Abdulla Khan Bahadur Firuz Jang undertook expeditions against the Nizam Shahi kingdom of Ahmednagar. Under Jahangir, the British East India Company was permitted to establish factories in Surat in 1612. During reign of the next viceroy Muqarrab Khan, Jahangir arrived at Ahmedabad for an extended visit to Gujarat. In January 1618, he appointed his son Prince Shah Jahan as the next viceroy. Shah Jahan rebelled against his father, Jahangir, in 1622-1623 and he was replaced by Prince Dawar Bakhsh (also known as Sultan Bulaqi) whose imperial forces recovered Bharuch and Surat. Upon the death of Dawar Bakhsh's guardian (Mirza Aziz Koka), Khan Jahan was briefly appointed as the viceroy. Subsequently, Saif Khan served as the viceroy of Gujarat until the end of Jahangir's reign and Shah Jahan's ascension in 1627.

Following his appointment as viceroy in 1618, Prince Shah Jahan governed through his deputies Rustam Khan and Raja Vikramjit until the start of his rebellion against Jahangir in 1622. During this time, land was acquired in the suburb of Maqsudpur on the banks of the Sabarmati River for a royal garden, which later came to be known as Shahi Bagh.

Under Shah Jahan (1627–1658)

On the death of Jahangir in 1627, his son Shah Jahan formally ascended to the throne in February 1628. Under Shah Jahan, Sher Khan Tur (Nahir Khan) was first appointed viceroy in 1628. This marked the start of expansion efforts south with attacks on the districts of Nasik , Sangamner, and Baglan, including the capture of the fort of Chandor. After Sher Khan Tur and until 1635, three nobles — Islam Khan, Baqir Khan, Sipahdar Khan — were appointed as viceroys because they sent expensive gifts to the emperor. Thereafter, Saif Khan, who previously served as the effective viceroy in the last years of Jahangir, was appointed as viceroy; he was then replaced by Azam Khan who served as viceroy until 1642. Azam Khan is said to have brought order to the province by subduing the Chunvalis Kolis in the northeast and the Kathi tribes near Dhandhuka terrorizing them by the destruction of their crops and their plantations. Through the Jam Lakhaji of Nawanagar, he set an example with regards to the collection of tribute from the Rajput chiefs of Saurashtra, who defied imperial authority and disobeyed the viceroys. Mirza Isa Tarkhan, who was appointed the next viceroy, carried out financial reforms by introducing bhagvatai or the "share system of levying revenue in kind."

After being appointed as the viceroy of Gujarat in 1645, Prince Aurangzeb Aurangzeb was in involved in religious dispute with both Hindus and Muslims. He ordered the conversion of the Jain temple of Chintamani at Saraspur — built by a jeweler named Shantidas in 1625 — into a mosque named 'Quvvat-ul-Islam'. Aurangzeb also issued an injunction against the dilution of indigo with dust and white sand. Aurangzeb was recalled in 1646 to assist with the conquest of Balkh and Badakhshan and was replaced by Shaistah Khan. Shaishtah Khan failed to subdue the Chunvalis Kolis and attempted to monopolize indigo and other goods by buying them from tradesmen at his own rates. Thereafter, Prince Dara Shukoh was appointed viceroy of Gujarat whose deputy Ghairat Khan (Baqir Beg) brought along an imperial decree that partially restored the Jain temple of Chintamani back to Shantidas. Shaistah Khan was then appointed viceroy of Gujarat for a second time and undertook campaigns against the Chunvalis Kolis and carried out repairs for the city-walls of Ahmedabad. In 1654, Prince Murad Bakhsh was appointed the viceroy of Gujarat. In 1657, hearing news of Shah Jahan's severe illness, Murad Bakhsh claimed the Mughal throne, annexed Surat to collect resources for his campaign, and formed an alliance with Aurangzeb with an informal arrangement for the division of the Mughal Empire. 

Shah Jahan appointed Maharaja Jaswant Singh of Jodhpur and Qasim Khan as the viceroys of Malwa and Gujarat, respectively; Murad Bakhsh was instructed to proceed to Berar and the newly appointed viceroys were ordered to engage with Murad Bakhsh if he failed to comply with the commands. The combined forces of Murad Bakhsh and Aurangzeb defeated the imperial generals at the battle of Dharmat. They subsequently faced and defeated the army of Prince Dara Shikoh at the Battle of Samugarh, eight miles from Agra Fort. Soon after, Aurangzeb imprisoned Murad Bakhsh (for killing his Diwan, Ali Naqi, in Ahmedabad in 1657), confined Shah Jahan, and declared himself the emperor in 1658.

Gujarat experienced a severe famine in 1630-1631 resulting in significant deaths of men, women, and cattle.

Under Aurangzeb (1658–1707)

After the imprisonment of Prince Murad Bakhsh and the desertion of Prince Dara Shikoh, Aurangzeb went through his first coronation in July 1658. He forgave Maharaja Jaswant Singh of Jodhpur and appointed him as the viceroy of Gujarat in reward for deserting Prince Dara Shikoh before the battle of Deorai. Qutb-ud-din Khan served as acting viceroy after Maharaja Jaswant Singh and temporarily annexed Navanagar (renamed to Islamnagar) into the Mughal Empire. He was succeeded by Mahabat Khan as the next viceroy of Gujarat.

Edicts issued by Aurangzeb include a ban of the cultivation of the poppy plant and the appointment of a censor of public morals to enforce the laws of Islam and a prohibition of intoxicants (distilled spirits, bhang, etc.). Aurangzeb's farman of 1665 prohibited a large number of burdensome taxes levied by the imperial officials of Gujarat. On the other hand, Aurangzeb required Hindu merchants to keep their shops open on the auspicious days of pancham, amvas, and the ekadashi; moreover, he prohibited Hindus from celebrating certain Diwali and Holi customs. He enacted equalized, but discriminatory, excise duties on the sale of commodities with Muslims paying 2.50% (for two years) but Hindus paying 5.0% (indefinitely).

In January 1664, Maratha leader Shivaji plundered Surat and emptied its riches. Under the next viceroy Bahadur Khan (Khan Jahan Koka), on account of Shivaji's attacks against the state and island-fortress of Janjira, an alliance was struck the Sidi ruler of Janjira and the Mughal Empire. Maharaja Jaswant Singh was appointed the viceroy for a second time and Navanagar was partially restored to its ruler. The next viceroy, Muhammad Amin Khan, took office in 1672 and, unusually, held it for 10 years. During this time, Muhammad Amin Khan dealt with the revolt of Rao Gopinath, the ruler of Idar, a number of edicts from Aurangzeb highlighting the theocratic of his rule, and the jaziya (capitation tax) on all non-Muslims throughout the Mughal Empire (poor paid 12 dirhams per head, middle class paid 24 dirhams per head, and the rich paid 48 dirhams per head).

Under Aurangzeb's reign, measures were undertaken for the conservation of public monuments and for repairs to fortifications including the fort of Azamabad, the fort of Junagadh, the city-walls of Ahmedabad, and the royal palaces in the Bhadra citadel. Under the next viceroy, Mukhtar Khan, Ahmedabad faced a flood and a famine. Shujaat Khan (Kartalab Khan) held office as the next viceroy for sixteen years ending his tenure with broad popularity among the citizens of Gujarat. He contained a revolt of Shia Muslims (Momnas and Matias who were members of the Imam Shahi sect) in 1691 and undertook a campaign against the Khachars and other Kathi tribes wherein he attacked the fort of Than and destroyed the ancient temple of the Sun. In 1694, Shujaat Khan received orders from Aurangzeb to demolish the temple at Vadnagar. He was initially entrusted the command of the war against the Rathors of Marwar and later negotiated peace arrangements with Durgadas Rathod of Marwar. Following Shujaat Khan's death, Prince Muhammad Azam Shah was appointed as the viceroy. Upon Aurangzeb's orders, Prince Muhammad Azam ordered Durgadas to attend court in Ahmedabad in the hopes of imprisoning or killing him with the help of Safdar Khan Babi; however, Durgadas grew suspicious and escaped. After a brief period of conflict, Durgadas appealed for and agreed to a second truce in 1705. 

In 1706, the Marathas, under the command of Dhanaji Jadhav, invaded Gujarat reaching as far as Bharuch and defeating the imperial forces at Ratanpur and at Baba Piara ghat. Upon hearing that Aurangzeb had appointed Prince Bidar Bakht as the next viceroy until the arrival of Ibrahim Khan, the Marathas left Gujarat. Ibrahim Khan took over the office of the viceroy in February 1707 just a few days before the passing of Aurangzeb. Taking advantage of Aurangzeb's death, the Marathas launched a second invasion under Balaji Vishvanath and reached as far as Ahmedabad. Fearing heavy plunder, Ibrahim Khan negotiated and paid a heavy tribute of 210,000 rupees to withdraw. Aurangzeb's death led to another civil war, which resulted in the victory of Prince Muhammad Muazzam who ascended to the Mughal throne as Bahadur Shah I.

Gujarat experienced a drought and a famine in 1685 and 1686, respectively, which led to a shortage of grain and significant inflation in food prices.

Under Bahadur Shah I (1707-1712)

Gházi-ud-dín, Forty-third Viceroy, 1708–1710
In 1708, in consequence of last viceroy Ibráhím Khán’s resignation, Gházi-ud-dín Khán Bahádur Fírúz Jang was appointed forty-third viceroy of Gujarát. The leaning of the new emperor towards Shia tenets and his order to insert in the Friday sermon the words the lawful successor of the Prophet after the name of Ali, the fourth Khalífah, besides giving general dissatisfaction, caused a small disturbance in Áhmedábád. On the first Friday on which the sermon was read the Túráni or Turk soldiers publicly called on the preacher to desist on pain of death. The preacher disregarding their threats on the next Friday was pulled down from the pulpit by the Túránis and brained with a mace. In the same year (1708), hearing that the representative of Sháhi Álam had a copy of a Quran written by the Imám Áli Taki, son of Músa Razá (810–829), the emperor expressed a wish to obtain a sight of it, and the viceroy sent it to him at Mándu in charge of Sayad Âkil and Salábat Khán Bábi. In 1709, Shariât Khán, brother of Abdúl Hamíd Khán, was appointed minister in place of his brother, who obtained the office of chief Kázi. Much treasure was sent to the imperial camp by order of the emperor. Ajítsingh of Márwár now rebelled and recovered Jodhpur. As the emperor wished to visit Ajmer, the viceroy of Gujarát was directed to join him with his army.

At this time the pay of a horseman is said to have been Rupees 34 and of a footman Rupees 4 a month. During his administration, Fírúz Jang introduced the practice, which his successors continued, of levying taxes on grain piece-goods and garden produce on his own account, the viceroy’s men by degrees getting into their hands the whole power of collecting. In 1710, when on tour exacting tribute, the viceroy fell ill at Danta and was brought to Áhmedábád, where he died. As Fírúz Jang had not submitted satisfactory accounts, his property was confiscated, and in 1711 Amánat Khán, governor of Surat, was appointed deputy viceroy with the title of Shahámat Khán. When Shahámat Khán was levying tribute from the Kadi and Vijapur districts, he heard that a Marátha force had advanced to the Bába Pyara ford on the Narmada river. He at once marched to oppose them, summoning Sayad Áhmed Gíláni, governor of Sorath, to his assistance. When he reached Ankleshwar, the Maráthás met him, and a battle was fought in which the Maráthás were defeated. Shahámat Khán then proceeded to Surat, and, after providing for its safety returned to Áhmedábád. In spite of their reverse at Ankleshwar, the Maráthás from this time began to make yearly raids into Gujarát.

Under Jahandar Shah (1712–1713)

Ásif-ud-Daulah, Forty-fourth Viceroy, 1712–13
In 1712, the emperor died, and was succeeded by his son Jahandar Shah, and Ásif-ud-daulah Asad Khán Bahádur was appointed forty-fourth viceroy of Gujarát. As Muhammad Beg Khán, who was then at Kharkol, was a favourite of the new viceroy and through his interest was appointed deputy, he went to Áhmedábád, and Shahámat Khán was transferred to Málwa as viceroy. In the meantime, Muhammad Beg Khán was appointed governor of Surat, and Sarbuland Khán Bahádur was sent to Áhmedábád as deputy viceroy. On his way to Gujarát, Sarbuland Khán was robbed in the Ságbára wilds to the east of Rájpípla. On his arrival he promptly marched against the rebellious Kolis of the Chunvál and subdued them. At the end of the year, as Farrukhsiyar, son of Ázím-us-Shán, second son of the late emperor, was marching with a large army on the capital, Sarbuland Khán returned to Delhi.

Under Farrukhsiyar (1713–1719)

This expedition of Farrukhsiyar was successful. He put Jahandar Shah to death and mounted the throne in 1713. As he had been raised to the throne mainly by the aid of Sayads Husain Áli and Abdullah Khán, the new emperor fell under the power of these nobles. He concluded treaty with Ajitsingh of Jodhpur. Daud Khan Panni, the powerful general, was appointed as the viceroy but there were riots in Ahmedabad in 1714. Ajitsingh was appointed as the next viceroy who had disputes with other noble  Haidar Kúli Khán. After some reluctance, Ajitsingh let Khán Daurán Nasrat Jang Bahádur to be appointed as the next viceroy. In 1719, the emperor Farrukhsiyar was deposed by influential Sayad brothers in 1719.

Under  Muhammad Shah (1719–1748)

Farrukhsiyar was succeeded by the short reigns of Rafi ud-Darajat and Shah Jahan II. Finally Muhammad Shah was raised to the throne by them. To make peace with powerful vassal, he appointed Ajítsingh of Márwár as a viceroy. The Maratha incursions continued and Píláji Gáikwár established himself at Songad near southern border of Gujarat. Ajit Singh had appointed Anopsingh Bhandari as his deputy. For helping to depose the influential Sayad brothers, Haidar Kúli Khán was appointed the next viceroy. People discontent with Anopsingh rejoiced his appointment but he tried to make himself free so he was recalled. Nizám-ul-Mulk took over who had to face the Maratha incursion again. The Marathas taking advantage of weakening Mughal Empire started extracting tribute from Gujarat regularly. The next viceroy Sarbuland Khan came in conflict with the Marathas whose generals were first defeated at Kapadvanj and again at Aras. The infighting in Marathas later stalled their advances. The imperial troops were sent by the emperor to help. Finally, the Marathas were defeated at Sojitra and Kapadvanj and pushed back from their inroads in Gujarat. In subsequent years, the Marathas attacked Vadnagar and later captured Baroda, Dabhoi and Champaner. The growing power of Marathas in southern Gujarat can not be contained.

In 1730, Abheysingh was appointed as the viceroy who defeated Mubáriz-ul-Mulk at Adalaj who has opposed his appointment. He soon allied with Maratha Peshwa and defeated another Maratha Gaikwar. He returned to Marwar placing Ratansingh Bhandari, his deputy, in charge. He recovered Baroda but his rivalry with other Mughal leaders Momin Khan and Sohrab Khan weaken him. Soon Momin Khan was appointed as the viceroy but he had to laid siege of Ahmedabad to be in power as Ratansingh had not complied with the order. Soon the emperor reappointed Abheysingh but Momin Khan continued siege. He took help of Damaji Gaikwar and finally captured Ahmedabad. He had to share revenues with Gaikwars but soon disagreements rose and they had fights. He tried to manage his control over Gujarat but the Marathas keep growing and expanding their power. After death of Momin Khan, Fidá-ud-dín managed the province foe a while. Abdúl Ázíz Khán, the commander of Junnar near Pune came to power due to forged order but later had to relinquish. Muftakhir Khán, son of Momin Khan, appointed as the next viceroy. During his reign, the Marathas came to Ahmedabad and continued to attack towns in central Gujarat. Fakhr-ud-daulah succeeded him. He had some peace due to internal struggles between the different houses of the Marathas had slow down their advances in Gujarat.

In 1748, the emperor Muhammad Shah died and was succeeded by his son Ahmad Shah Bahadur.

Under Ahmad Shah Bahadur (1748–1754)

The emperor Ahmad Shah Bahadur appointed Vakhatsingh, brother of Mahárája Abheysingh of Marwar as a viceroy but he never took a charge. He was the last viceroy appointed by the Mughal emperor. Sensing opportunity in weakening Mughal power, the Marathas and the Mughal nobles started plotting to establish themselves in Gujarat. The Maratha houses, Gaikwar and Peshwa, engaged in a struggle and finally brokered a peace. Jawan Mard Khan, who was incharge of Ahmedabad, had to surrender to them after a long siege. Thus the Marathas established themselves firmly in Gujarat in 1752. In 1754, Ahmad Shah Bahadur was deposed and Alamgir II came to power on the Mughal throne.

Under Alamgir II  (1754–1756)

The Marathas driven out the Mughal nobles under the emperor Alamgir II. One such noble, Momin Khan, had countered their advances and recovered Ahmedabad in 1756 lost to the Marathas few years ago. After a long siege, Ahmedabad fell again in hands of the Marathas. The Marathas levied tributes across Gujarat. In 1759, the English of the British East India Company captured Surat.

Sadashiv Ramchandra was appointed as a viceroy by Peshwa in 1760 followed by Apa Ganesh in 1761. Following defeat of Marathas in the Third Battle of Panipat (1761), the nobles briefly recovered towns from the Marathas but soon had to surrender. Thus the Marathas firmly established themselves in Gujarat.

Administration
The Gujarat subah covered an area of 302 kos (966.4 kilometres) between Burhanpur in the east and Jagat (Dwarka) in the west and 70 kos (224 kilometres) between Jalore in the north and Daman in the south. The twenty-five sarkars (administrative units) of Gujarat Sultanate were reorganised in 16 sarkars and the others areas were transferred back to its older provinces. Of this 16 sarkars; nine were under direct control of the Mughal Empire; Ahmadabad, Baroda,
Bharuch, Champaner, Godhra, Nadaut, Patan, Sorath, and Surat. They were known as sarkarat-i kharaji where the Mughal fiscal system of revenue collection was applied. The other seven sarkars were under administration and fiscal jurisdictions of the local chiefs; Bansballa (Banswada), Dungarpur, Kutch, Nawanagar, Ramnagar, Sirohi and Sant. They were known as sarkarat-i peshkashi where annual tribute (peshkash) was collected by the Mughals. This local chiefs, zamindars, acknowledged the Mughal suzerainty and occasionally provided military support.

Throughout the Mughal Empire, the single trimetallic currency was established but Gujarat continued to use a local silver coin known as Mahmudi alongside the Mughal currency.

List of Mughal Viceroys of Gujarat (1573-1754)

Under Akbar (1573–1605)
The following are the Mughal viceroys of Gujarat under Akbar:

 Mirza Aziz Koka, Khan-i-Azam, 1573–1575
 Mirza Abdurrahim Khan (through Vazir Khan), 1575–1578
 Shihab-ud-din Ahmad Khan, 1578–1583
 Itimad Khan Gujarati, 1583
 Mírza Abdurrahim Khan (second time), 1584–1589
 Mírza Aziz Koka (second time), 1590–1593
 Prince Murad Baksh, 1593–1594
 Mirza Aziz Koka (third time, through his sons), 1600–1605

Under Jahangir (1605–1627)
The following are the Mughal viceroys of Gujarat under Jahangir:

 Qulij Khan and Raja Vikramjit, 1605–1606
 Shaikh Farid-i-Bukhari (Murtaza Khan), 1606–1609
 Mírza Aziz Koka (fourth time, through Jahangir Quli Khan as deputy), 1609–1611
 Abdulla Khan Fíruz Jang, 1611–1616
 Muqarrab Khan, 1616–1618
 Prince Shah Jahan (through Rustam Khan and Sundardas, Raja Vikramjit), 1618–1623
 Prince Dawar Baksh, 1623–1624
 Khan Jahan Lodi (through Saif Khan), 1624–1627

Under Shah Jahan (1627–1658)
The following are the Mughal viceroys of Gujarat under Shah Jahan:

 Sher Khan Tur, 1628–1631
 Islam Khan, Baqir Khan, and Sipahdar Khan, 1631—1635
 Saif Khan, 1635–1636
 Azam Khan, 1636–1642
 Mirza Isa Tarkhan, 1642–1645
 Prince Aurangzeb, 1645–1646
 Shaistah Khan, 1646–1648
 Prince Dara Shukoh, 1648–1652
 Shaistah Khan (second time), 1652–1654
 Prince Murad Bakhsh, 1654–1658

Under Aurangzeb (1658–1707)
The following are the Mughal viceroys of Gujarat under Aurangzeb:

 Shah Nawaz Khan Safavi, 1658—1659
 Maharaja Jaswant Singh, 1659–1662
 Mahabat Khan, 1662–1668
 Bahadur Khan, 1668–1670
 Maharaj Jaswant Singh (second time), 1670–1672
 Muhammad Amin Khan, 1672–1682
 Mukhtar Khan, 1682–1684
 Shujaat Khan (Kartalab Khan), 1685–1701
 Prince Muhammad Azam Shah, 1701–1705
 Prince Muhammad Bidar Bakht, 1706–1707
 Ibrahim Khan,1707

Under Bahadur Shah I (1707-1712)
The following are the Mughal viceroys of Gujarat under Bahadur Shah I:

 Ghazi-ud-din Khan Bahadur Firuz Jang, 1708–1710

Under Jahandar Shah (1712–1713)
 Ásif-ud-Daulah, Forty-fourth Viceroy, 1712–13

Under Farrukhsiyar (1713–1719)
 Shahámat Khán, Forty-fifth Viceroy, 1713
 Daud Khan Panni, Forty-sixth Viceroy, 1714–15
 Mahárája Ajítsingh, Forty-seventh Viceroy, 1715–16
 Khán Daurán Nasrat Jang Bahádur, Forty-eighth Viceroy, 1716–1719

Under Muhammad Shah (1719–1748)
 Mahárája Ajítsingh, Forty-ninth Viceroy, 1719–1721 (second time)
 Haidar Kúli Khán, Fiftieth Viceroy, 1721–1722
 Nizám-ul-Mulk, Fifty-first Viceroy, 1722
 Sarbuland Khan, Fifty-second Viceroy, 1723–1730
 Mahárája Abheysingh, Fifty-third Viceroy, 1730–1733
 Ratansingh Bhandári, Deputy Viceroy, 1733–1737
 Momín Khán, Fifty-fourth Viceroy, 1737
 Mahárája Abheysingh, Fifty-fifth Viceroy, 1737 (second time)
 Momín Khán, Fifth-sixth Viceroy, 1738–1743 (second time)
 Fidá-ud-dín acts as Viceroy, 1743
 Abdúl Ázíz Khán of Junnar, Viceroy (by a forged order)
 Muftakhir Khán, Fifty-seventh Viceroy, 1743–44
 Fakhr-ud-daulah, Fifty-eighth Viceroy, 1744–1748

Under Ahmad Shah Bahadur (1748–1756)
 Mahárája Vakhatsingh, Fifty-ninth Viceroy, 1748 (never took charge)

Notes

References 

  

 
 

 
Mughal subahs
Subahdars of Gujarat
Medieval India